HD 185269 is a stellar triple system approximately 170 light-years away in the constellation Cygnus. It is easily visible to binoculars, but not the naked eye.

The primary star is a third more massive and four times more luminous than the Sun. The spectrum of the star is G0IV. About 4.5 arcseconds away are the two other stars, which are much less massive than the Sun.

Planetary system
The Jupiter-mass hot Jupiter was independently discovered orbiting the primary star by two different teams using doppler spectroscopy. One group led by Claire Moutou used the ELODIE spectrograph at the Haute-Provence Observatory in France while John Asher Johnson and collaborators used the Coudé Auxiliary and C. Donald Shane telescopes at Lick Observatory in California. The planet takes 6.8 days to orbit at 0.077 AU from the primary star in an eccentric orbit.

See also
 List of extrasolar planets

References

External links
 
 

Cygnus (constellation)
G-type subgiants
185269
096507
Planetary systems with one confirmed planet
Durchmusterung objects